Gerard Davison (c. 1967 – 5 May 2015) was a commander of the Provisional IRA. He was shot and killed on 5 May 2015. One of the first operations he was involved in was shooting dead IPLO Belfast Brigade commander Sammy Ward during the same Night of the Long Knives in Belfast. 

Davison was questioned about the murder of Robert McCartney in January 2005. He was released without charge. Davison had been a community worker in the working class Markets area of Belfast.

Death
On 5 May 2015 around 09:00, Davison was shot numerous times at Welsh Street in the Markets area of south Belfast. While police do not know who killed him, Kevin McGuigan, a former subordinate of Davison's, was named as the chief suspect after he was also shot dead, reportedly by members of the Provisional IRA, on 12 August 2015.

On the evening of the killing, The Guardian’s Henry McDonald reported: “Davison is the most senior pro-peace process republican to have been killed since the IRA ceasefire of 1997. Security sources said it was highly unlikely that any Ulster loyalist group was behind the murders, adding that the killers may instead have come from within the nationalist community, possibly from people who had a longstanding grudge against the victim.”

Following his arrest in Fuengirola in August 2021, it was revealed Gerry ‘The Monk’ Hutch was to be questioned in relation to a weapon used in Davison's murder.

References

External links
http://sluggerotoole.com/2015/08/25/tanaiste-this-is-an-insidious-threat-to-northern-irelands-future-as-a-healthy-stable-democracy-and-therefore-a-threat-to-the-whole-of-this-island/
http://sluggerotoole.com/2015/08/22/members-of-pira-carried-out-their-own-investigation-into-the-davison-killing/
http://www.irishtimes.com/news/politics/provisional-ira-may-have-left-stage-but-not-theatre-1.2324978
http://www.rte.ie/news/2015/0820/722541-kevin-mcguigan-belfast/

1960s births
2015 deaths
2015 in Northern Ireland
2015 murders in the United Kingdom
Deaths by firearm in Northern Ireland
Paramilitaries from Belfast
People murdered in Belfast
Provisional Irish Republican Army members
Unsolved murders in Northern Ireland